Poincaré theorem may refer to:

 Poincaré conjecture, on homeomorphisms to the sphere;
 Poincaré recurrence theorem, on sufficient conditions for recurrence to take place in dynamical systems;
 Poincaré-Bendixson theorem, on the existence of attractors for two-dimensional dynamical systems;
 Poincaré–Birkhoff–Witt theorem, concerning lie algebras and their universal envelopes.